Wangosaurus is an extinct genus of basal pistosauroid known from the Middle Triassic (late Ladinian stage) Falang Formation of Xingyi in Guizhou Province, southwestern China. It contains a single species, Wangosaurus brevirostris, first described and named by Le-Tian Ma, Da-Yong Jiang, Olivier Rieppel, Ryosuke Motani and Andrea Tintori in 2015. The specific name brevirostris comes from Greek for "short snout".

References

Pistosaurs
Triassic sauropterygians
Ladinian genera
Middle Triassic reptiles of Asia
Triassic China
Fossils of China
Paleontology in Guizhou
Xingyi, Guizhou
Fossil taxa described in 2015
Sauropterygian genera